Sylvestr (Сильвестр in Ukrainian) (–1123, aged 67-68) was a clergyman and a writer in Kievan Rus'.

Some sources name Sylvestr as a compiler of either the Primary Chronicle itself or its second edition. He was a hegumen of the Vydubetsky Monastery in Kiev, which had been founded by Prince Vsevolod Yaroslavich. In 1118, Sylvestr was sent to Pereiaslav as a bishop.

As a person close to Vsevolod's son Vladimir Monomakh, Sylvestr played a notable role in political and ecclesiastical affairs of Kievan Rus.

He is said to have continued the work of St Nestor the Chronicler and written nine Lives of the holy saints of the Kiev Caves. He is celebrated on September 28 and commemorated on January 2.

References 

Russian religious leaders
Orthodox Christian Chroniclers
12th-century historians
Vydubychi Monastery
1050s births
1123 deaths
Year of birth uncertain